This is a list of vampires found in literary fiction; film and television; comics and manga; video games and board games; musical theatre, opera and theatre; and originating in folklore or mythology. It does not include the concept of dhampirs.

Literary

A

 Aaron Darnell (Women of the Otherworld)
 Addhéma (Féval's La Vampire)
 Adrian Ivashkov (Vampire Academy)
 Akasha (The Vampire Chronicles)
 Alec (Twilight series)
 Alexander Sterling (Vampire Kisses)
 Akivasha (books and stories by Robert E. Howard)
 Alice Cullen (Twilight series)
 Alistair (Twilight series)
 Amelie (The Morganville Vampires)
 Amun (Twilight series)
 Andre Paul (The Southern Vampire Mysteries)
 Angel (Buffy the Vampire Slayer, Angel)
 Anita Blake (Anita Blake: Vampire Hunter)
 Anna von Schlotterstein (The Little Vampire)
 Anthea Ernchester (Those Who Hunt the Night, Traveling with the Dead)
 Aoife (The Necromancer: The Secrets of the Immortal Nicholas Flamel)
 Armand (The Vampire Chronicles)
 Aro (Twilight series)
 Arra Sails (The Saga of Darren Shan)
 Arrow (The Saga of Darren Shan)
 Ash Redfern (Night World)
 Asher (Anita Blake: Vampire Hunter)
 Athenodora (Twilight series)
 Ather (In the Forests of the Night)
 Aubrey (In the Forests of the Night)
 Aubrey (Anita Blake: Vampire Hunter)
 Augustine (Anita Blake: Vampire Hunter)
 Avicus (The Vampire Chronicles)

B

 Balthazar More (Evernight)
 Barnabas Collins (Dark Shadows novels)
 Bella Cullen (Breaking Dawn) 
 Ben Cortman (I Am Legend)
 Benjamin (Twilight series)
 Benjamin "Jack" Force (Blue Bloods)
 Bianca Solderini (The Vampire Chronicles)
 Bianca St. Claire (The Dresden Files)
 Bill Compton (The Southern Vampire Mysteries)
 Bishop (The Morganville Vampires)
 Bones (Night Huntress series)
 Boris Dragosani (Blood Brothers, The Last Aerie, Bloodwars)
 Boris Liatoukine (Captain Vampire)
 Brad Moreau (Vampire Beach)
 Bree Tanner (Twilight series)
 Bunnicula (Bunnicula)
 Baz (My Buddy Baz)

C

 Caelan (Skulduggery Pleasant)
 Caius (Twilight series)
 Camazotz (Vampire Plague)
 Camille Belcourt (The Mortal Instruments and The Infernal Devices)
 Carlisle Cullen (Twilight series)
 Carlos Rivera (The Vampire Huntress Legend)
 Carmen (Twilight series)
 Casanova (The Scarlet Cherie: Vampire Series)
 Carmilla Karnstein (Carmilla)
 Cassandra DuCharme (Women of the Otherworld)
 Caroline Forbes (The Vampire Diaries)
 Catherine "Cat" Crawfield (Night Huntress series)
 Charity More (Evernight)
 Charles (Twilight series)
 Charles Farren (Those Who Hunt the Night, Traveling with the Dead)
 Charles Twining (The Southern Vampire Mysteries)
 Charlotte (Twilight series)
 Chelsea (Twilight series)
 Chow (The Southern Vampire Mysteries)
 Chris (Thirsty)
 Christian (Lost Souls)
 Christopher "Nice Guy" Carboni (The Blood Maker and the Witch's Curse)
 Christian Ozera (Vampire Academy)
 Christopher Ravena (Shattered Mirror)
 Claire Morgan (The Blood Maker and the Witch's Curse)
 Clarimonde (La Morte Amoureuse)
 Claudia (The Vampire Chronicles)
 Cordelia Van Alen (Blue Bloods)
 Count Dracula (Dracula, Young Dracula, Fred Saberhagen's The Dracula Series)
 Count Nightwing (Goosebumps)
 Countess Yvonne (Give Yourself Goosebumps)
 Count von Count (Sesame Street)
 Curie Drakulya (Monster Musume)

D

 D'Ablo (The Chronicles of Vladimir Tod)
 Damian (Anita Blake: Vampire Hunter)
 Damien Maslin (House of Night series)
 Damon Salvatore (The Vampire Diaries)
 Daniel Molloy (The Vampire Chronicles)
 Danny Glick ('Salem's Lot)
 Darius Shan (The Saga of Darren Shan)
 Darren Shan (The Saga of Darren Shan)
 Darla (Angel)
 David Talbot (The Vampire Chronicles)
 Deathtopia Virtuoso Suicide-Master (Monogatari Series)
 Delos Redfern (Night World)
 Demetri (Twilight series)
 Didyme (Twilight series)
 Dimitri Belikov (Vampire Academy)
 Dio Brando (JoJo's Bizarre Adventure)
 Dominic "Fangs" Mangano (The Blood Maker and the Witch's Curse)
 Don Santiago de Valdez (The Horror from the Mound)
 Don Simon Christian Xavier Morado-de la Cadena Ysidro (Those Who Hunt the Night and Traveling with the Dead)
 Dorian (The Chronicles of Vladimir Tod)
 Dragon, King of Arms (Discworld)
 Dragon Lankford (House of Night series)
 Draculaura (Back And Deader Than Ever)
 Vlad Dracula Tepes (Castlevania)
 Dramaturgy (Monogatari Series)
 Drusilla (Buffy the Vampire Slayer, Angel)
 Dusk (Skulduggery Pleasant)
 The Dweller (Necroscope series)

E

 Ebony Dark'ness Dementia Raven Way (My Immortal (fan fiction))
 Edward Cullen (Twilight series)
 Edward Fender (The Last Vampire)
 Dr. Edward Lewis Weyland (The Vampire Tapestry)
 Eleazar (Twilight series)
 Elena Gilbert (The Vampire Diaries)
 Eli (Let The Right One In)
 Elijah Mikaelson (The Vampire Diaries)
 Emiel Regis Rohellec Terzieff-Godefroy (The Witcher series)
 Emily New (Real)
 Emmett Cullen (Twilight series)
 Enkil (The Vampire Chronicles)
 Episode (Monogatari Series)
 Erin Bates (House of Night series)
 Eric Northman (The Southern Vampire Mysteries)
 Erik Night (House of Night series)
 Esme Cullen (Twilight series)
 Eudoxia (The Vampire Chronicles)

F

 Faethor Ferenczy (Necroscope series)
 Fala (Demon in My View)
 Fallon Nuit (The Vampire Huntress Legend series)
 Felipe De Castro (The Southern Vampire Mysteries)
 Felix (Twilight series)
 Finn Mikaelson (The Vampire Diaries)
 Frank Collins (The Morganville Vampires)

G

 Gabrielle de Lioncourt (The Vampire Chronicles)
 Garrett (Twilight series)
 Garrid (The Frog Princess series)
 Gavner Purl (The Saga of Darren Shan)
 Godric (a.k.a. Godfrey) (The Southern Vampire Mysteries)
 Gyaos (Gamera Franchise)
 Győző Csermendy, Baali (Budapest by Night)

H

 Harmony (Buffy the Vampire Slayer, Angel)
 Harry Keogh (Necroscope series)
 Heidi (Twilight series)
 High-Waist (Monogatari Series)
 Hope Mikaelson (The Vampire Diaries)
 Hrishi (Skulduggery Pleasant)
 Hunter Redfern (Night World)

I

 Irina (Twilight series)
 Isabella von Carstein (Warhammer Fantasy Battles)
 Isara (Skulduggery Pleasant)
 Ivy Tamwood (Hollows series)
 Isabel (The Southern Vampire Mysteries)
 Jávor Mózes Ixion

J

 Jack Twist (House of Night series)
 Jack Fleming (The Vampire Files)
 Jade Redfern (Night World)
 Jagger Maxwell (Vampire Kisses)
 James (Twilight series)
 James Rasmussen (Night World)
 James Stark (House of Night series)
 Jander Sunstar (Vampire of the Mists)
 Jane (Twilight series)
 Jasper Hale (Twilight series)
 Jay Roussel (Real)
 Jean-Claude (Anita Blake: Vampire Hunter)
 Jenna Talbot (Hex Hall)
 Jesse Reeves (The Vampire Chronicles)
 Jeshickah (Midnight Predator)
 Jez Stukeley (Vampirates)
 Jezebel 'Jez' Redfern (Night World)
 Jillian "Jill" Mastrano Dragomir (Vampire Academy)
 Joel Desmodus (Desmodus)
 John "Not-A-Vampire-At-All" Smith (Discworld)
 Jonathan Barrett (The Vampire Files)
 John Mitchell (Being Human)
 John Quinn (Night World)
 Johnny Desperado (Vampirates)
 John Quinn 'Quinn' (Night World)
 Jukka Sarasti (Blindsight)

K

 Kachiri (Twilight series)
 Kaleo (Shattered Mirror)
 Kalika (The Last Vampire)
 Lady Karen (Necroscope series)
 Kaspar Varn (The Dark Heroine)
 Kate (Twilight series)
 Katherine Pierce (The Vampire Diaries)
 Kebi (Twilight series)
 Kestrel Redfern (Night World)
 Kira (Night Huntress series)
 Kiss-Shot Acerola-Orion Heart-Under-Blade (Monogatari Series)
 Khayman (The Vampire Chronicles)
 Klaus Mikaelson (The Vampire Diaries)
 Kojou Akatsuki (Strike the Blood)
 Kol Mikaelson (The Vampire Diaries)
 Koyomi Araragi (Monogatari Series)
 Kurda Smahlt (The Saga of Darren Shan)
 Kurt Barlow ('Salem's Lot)
 Konrad von Carstein (Warhammer Fantasy)
 Kyle (Blood & Iron Mythology)

L

 Lady Margolotta (Discworld)
 Lara Raith (The Dresden Files)
 Larten Crepsley (The Saga of Darren Shan)
 Laurent (Twilight series)
 Lawrence Van Alen (Blue Bloods)
 Lestat de Lioncourt (The Vampire Chronicles)
 Liam (Twilight series)
 Leif Helgarson (The Iron Druid Chronicles)
 Lenobia (House of Night series)
 Lilith (The Vampire Huntress Legend series)
 Lily Chen (The Mortal Instruments series)
 Lincoln "The Boss" Voss (The Blood Maker and the Witch's Curse)
 Louis de Pointe du Lac (The Vampire Chronicles)
 Long Shadow (The Southern Vampire Mysteries)
 Lorcan Furey (Vampirates)
 Lord Ruthven (The Vampyre)
 Loren Blake (House of Night series)
 Lorenzo St. John (The Vampire Diaries)
 Lucy (Twilight series)
 Lucy Westenra (Dracula)
 Lothos Buffy The Vampire Slayer
 Low-Rise (Monogatari Series)
 Luna Maxwell (Vampire Kisses)
 Lucas Ross (Evernight)

M

 Madeline "Mimi" Force (Blue Bloods)
 Mael (The Vampire Chronicles)
 Maggie (Twilight series)
 Magnus (The Vampire Chronicles)
 Magnus de la Gardie (Count Magnus)
 Magpyr family (Discworld)
 Maharet (The Vampire Chronicles)
 Makenna (Twilight series)
 Maladict (Discworld)
 Mannfred von Carstein (Warhammer Fantasy Battles)
 Marcus (Twilight series)
 Marcus Cannon (The Blood Maker and the Witch's Curse)
 Marshall "Crowbar" Rizzo (The Blood Maker and the Witch's Curse)
 Maria (Twilight series)
 Mary (Twilight series)
 The Master (Buffy the Vampire Slayer, Angel)
Matthew de Clairmont (A Discovery of Witches)
 Maureen Brown (The Mortal Instruments)
 Mavra (The Dresden Files)
 Maya Redfern (Night World)
 Mekare (The Vampire Chronicles)
 Mencheres (Night Huntress series)
 Mia Rinaldi (Vampire Academy)
 Michael Glass (The Morganville Vampires)
 Mikaela Hyakuya (Seraph of the End)
 Mika Ver Leth (The Saga of Darren Shan)
 Mircea Basarab (The Cassandra Palmer series)
 Moka Akashiya (Rosario + Vampire novelization)
 Moloch (Skulduggery Pleasant)
 Molochai (Lost Souls)
 Morning McCobb (Suck It Up)
 Morgead Blackthorn (Night World)
 Myrnin (The Morganville Vampires)

N

 Natasha "Tasha" Ozera (Vampire Academy)
 Nathaniel Cade (Blood Oath)
 Neferata (Warhammer Fantasy Battles)
 Neferet (House of Night series)
 Nettie (Twilight series)
 Nicholas "Nick" Knight (Forever Knight)
 Nicholas "Schemer" Pacini (The Blood Maker and the Witch's Curse)
 Nicolas de Lenfent (The Vampire Chronicles)
 Nikolas Ravena (Shattered Mirror)
 Nikolaos Midas (The Scarlet Cherie: Vampire Series)
 Nissa Ravena (Shattered Mirror)
 Noah Vance (I Heart Vampires: Birth (A Confessions of a High School Vampire Novel))
 Nothing (Lost Souls)
 Nukesaku (JoJo's Bizarre Adventure: Stardust Crusaders)
 Nicodemus "Nicky" Petty (Carry On)

O

 Oliver (The Morganville Vampires)
 Otis (The Chronicles of Vladimir Tod)
 Otto von Chriek (Discworld)

P

 Pam Ravenscroft (The Southern Vampire Mysteries)
 Pandora (The Vampire Chronicles)
 Paul "Oddball" Oddo (The Blood Maker and the Witch's Curse)
 Paris Skyle (The Saga of Darren Shan)
 Peter (Twilight series)
 Petronia (The Vampire Chronicles)
 Piscary (Hollows series)
 Poppy North (Night World)

Q

R

 Raphael Santiago (The Mortal Instruments series)
 Raven Madison (Vampire Kisses)
 Randall (Twilight series)
 Rebekah Mikaelson (The Vampire Diaries)
 Renata (Twilight series)
 Riley Biers (Twilight series)
 Richard D'orleans/Richard Dun (Lord Richard, Vampire) 
 Risika (In the Forests of the Night)
 Rosalie Hale (Twilight series)
 Rosemarie Hathaway (Vampire Academy)
 Rowan Redfern (Night World)
 Rudolph Sackville-Bagg (Rüdiger von Schlotterstein) (The Little Vampire)
 Rynn Cormel (Hollows series)

S

 Sabra (Lord Richard, Vampire) 
 Sacred Ancestor (Vampire Hunter D)
 Saint-Germain (The Saint-Germain novels)
 Salacia "Sally" von Humpeding (Discworld)
 Samuel (Skulduggery Pleasant)
 Sanguini (Harry Potter and the Half-Blood Prince)
 Santiago (The Vampire Chronicles)
 Santiago (Twilight series)
 Santino (The Vampire Chronicles)
 Sara Vida (Shattered Mirror)
 Sasha (Twilight series)
 Sauron (The Silmarillion)
 Scarlet Cherie (The Scarlet Cherie: Vampire Series)
 Selene (Underworld novelizations)
 Sethra Lavode (Phoenix Guards books and Vlad Taltos series)
 Seymour Dorsten (The Last Vampire)
 Shaithis (Necroscope series)
 Shaunee Cole (House of Night series)
 Shinobu Oshino (Monogatari Series)
 Shizuka Hio (Vampire Knight)
 Sienna Devereux (Vampire Beach series)
 Silas (The Graveyard Book)
 Simon (The Silver Kiss)
 Simon Lewis (The Mortal Instruments) 
 Sinclair Jace/Mino/Estelle/Lucas (Constellation)
 Siobhan (Twilight series)
 Sir Francis Varney (Varney the Vampire)
 Sita (The Last Vampire)
 Slayer (Guilty Gear)
 Snow Witch (Fighting Fantasy series)
 Socrates (The Blood Maker and the Witch's Curse)
 Sonja (Underworld: Rise of the Lycans novelization)
 Sonja Blue (Sunglasses After Dark and other novels by Nancy A. Collins)
 Sonya Karp (Vampire Academy)
 Sophia Keren (So I'm a Spider, So What?)
 Sophie-Anne Leclerq (The Southern Vampire Mysteries)
 Sorin Markov (Zendikar: In the Teeth of Akoum)
 Spike (Buffy the Vampire Slayer, Angel)
 Spade (Night Huntress series)
 Stefan (Twilight series)
 Stefan Salvatore (The Vampire Diaries)
 Stevie Rae Johnson (House of Night series)
 Mrs. Stone (The Room in the Tower)
 Strahd von Zarovich (Ravenloft novels)
 Straits/Straizo (JoJo's Bizarre Adventure: Battle Tendency)
 Sulpicia (Twilight series)

T

 Tanya (Twilight series)
 Tatiana Ivashkov (Vampire Academy)
 Tarquin "Quinn" Blackwood (The Vampire Chronicles)
 Theodore "Fat Teddy" Bottari (The Blood Maker and the Witch's Curse)
 Thierry Descoudres (Night World)
 Thibor Ferenczy (Necroscope series)
 Thomas Raith (The Dresden Files)
 Timmy Jordan (Night World)
 Timmy Valentine (Vampire Junction)
 Tomas Tod (The Chronicles of Vladimir Tod)
 Tropicalesque Home-A-Wave Dog-Strings (Monogatari Series)
 Thuringwethil (The Silmarillion)
 Twig (Lost Souls)
 Tyrannus Basilton "Baz" Grimm-Pitch (Carry On)

U

V

 Valentine Cutter (Shadow Zone: The Undead Express)
 Valerie (The Vampire Diaries)
 Veronik Crnjak (The Vampire Diaries)
 Valentine (Monster High)
 Vanilla Ice/Cool Ice (JoJo's Bizarre Adventure: Stardust Crusaders)
 Vasagi the Suck (Necroscope series)
 Vasilisa "Lissa" Dragomir (Vampire Academy)
 Vasilii (Twilight series)
 Vancha March (The Saga of Darren Shan)
 Vanez Blane (The Saga of Darren Shan)
 Victor (Skulduggery Pleasant)
 Victoria (Twilight series)
Victoria "Vicki" Donovan (The Vampire Diaries)
 Victor Dashkov (Vampire Academy)
 Vikas (The Chronicles of Vladimir Tod)
 Violet Lee (The Dark Heroine)
 Vlad Tepesh (Night Huntress series)
 Vladimir (Twilight series)
 Vladimir Tod (The Chronicles of Vladimir Tod)
 Vlad von Carstein (Warhammer Fantasy Battles)

W

 Wired Beck (JoJo's Bizarre Adventure: Battle Tendency)
 Whitey Kroun (The Vampire Files)

X

 Xander Cartwright (The Blood Maker and the Witch's Curse)

Y

 Yaksha (The Last Vampire)
 Ysandre (The Morganville Vampires)
 Yulian Bodescu (Necroscope series)

Z

 Zafrina (Twilight series)
 Zenobia (The Vampire Chronicles)
 Zero Kiryuu (Vampire Knight)
 Zillah (Lost Souls)
 Zoe Takano (Women of the Otherworld)
 Zoey Redbird (House of Night series)

Film and television

Comics and manga

 Akasha Bloodriver (Rosario+Vampire)
 Akatsuki Kain (Vampire Knight)
 Alexander Sterling (Vampire Kisses)
 Alucard (Hellsing)
 Andrew Bennett (I...Vampire)
 Angel (Buffy comics/Buffyverse comics/Angel comics)
 Arya Johnson (The Chronicles of Arya)
 Aqua Shuzen (Rosario+Vampire)
 Bridget Brownlick (Chibi Vampire)
 Blade of the Marvel Universe story world published by Marvel Comics
 Boris Tepes Dracula (Shaman King)
 Chastity Marks (Chastity)
 Darla (Buffy comics/Buffyverse comics/Angel comics)
 Dracula / Fangs the Vampire (Dragon Ball)
 Drusilla (Buffy comics/Buffyverse comics/Angel comics)
 Deacon Frost (The Tomb of Dracula)
 Dio Brando (JoJo's Bizarre Adventure)
 Diva (Blood+)
 Dolorosa (The Dolorosa) (Homestuck)
 Elfriede (Tsukuyomi: Moon Phase)
 Evangeline A.K. McDowell (Negima and UQ Holder! series)
 Fai D. Flowright (Tsubasa: Reservoir Chronicle)
 Ferid Bathory (Seraph of the End)
 Glark (Chibi Vampire)
 Guilt-na-Zan (Vampire Doll: Guilt-Na-Zan)
 Haji (Blood+)
 Hanabusa Aido (Vampire Knight)
 Harmony (Buffy comics/Buffyverse comics/Angel comics)
 Haruka Kuran (Vampire Knight)
 Hazuki/Luna (Tsukuyomi: Moon Phase)
 Henry Marker (Chibi Vampire)
 Issa Shuzen (Rosario+Vampire)
 Jeremiah Parrish (Astro City)
 Jiro Mochizuki (Black Blood Brothers)
 Jules Duchon (Fat White Vampire Blues)
 Kahlua Shuzen (Rosario+Vampire)
 Kamui Shirō (Tsubasa: Reservoir Chronicle)
 Kaname Kuran (Vampire Knight)
 Kanaya Maryam (Homestuck)
 Karin Maaka (Chibi Vampire light novels)
 Koko Shuzen (Rosario+Vampire)
 Kojou Akatsuki (Strike the Blood)
 Krul Tepes (Seraph of the End)
 Jan Valentine (Hellsing)
 Luke Valentine (Hellsing)
 Maaka family (Chibi Vampire)
 Marlowe (30 Days of Night)
 Mary Seward (I…Vampire)
 The Master (Buffy comics/Buffyverse comics/Angel comics)
 Mina Tepeş (Dance in the Vampire Bund)
 Misaki Minato (Blood Alone)
 Moka Akashiya (Rosario+Vampire)
 The Monk (Detective Comics)
 Morbius, the Living Vampire (Spider-Man comics)
 Mordicus (PhD: Phantasy Degree)
 Nukesaku (JoJo's Bizarre Adventure)
 Noé Archiviste (The Case Study of Vanitas)
 Nozomu Moegi (Crescent Moon)
 Pearl Jones (American Vampire)
 Porrim Maryam (Homestuck)
 Proinsias Cassidy (Preacher)
 Ragamuffin (Lenore, the Cute Little Dead Girl)
 Reiri Kamura (Kaibutsu Oujo)
 Ren Maaka (Chibi Vampire light novels)
 Rido Kuran (Vampire Knight)
 Rima Toya (Vampire Knight)
 Rip van Winkle (Hellsing)
 Ruka Souen (Vampire Knight)
 Saya Otonashi (Blood+/Blood: The Last Vampire)
 Senri Shiki (Vampire Knight)
 Seras Victoria (Hellsing)
 Skinner Sweet (American Vampire)
 Sophie Twilight (Ms. Vampire Who Lives in My Neighborhood)
 Spike (Buffy comics/Buffyverse comics/Angel comics)
 Staz Charlie Blood (Blood Lad)
 Straizo (JoJo's Bizarre Adventure) 
 Subaru (Tsubasa: Reservoir Chronicle)
 Sunako Kirishiki (Shiki series)
 Takuma Ichijo (Vampire Knight)
 Trampire (Dr. Slump)
 Vampirella (Vampirella)
 Vanilla Ice (JoJo's Bizarre Adventure)
 Vic Vampire (Bug-a-Booo)
 Vicente (30 Days of Night)
 Walter C. Dornez (Hellsing)
 Yuki Cross (Vampire Knight)
 Wired Beck (JoJo's Bizarre Adventure)
 Yuriya Tachibana (Chibi Vampire)
 Zorin Blitz (Hellsing)
 Zero Kiryu (Vampire Knight)

Video games, board games, card games, and product placement 

A
 Alistair Grout (Vampire: The Masquerade – Bloodlines)
 Alucard (Castlevania series)
 Amy Sorel (Soul series)
 Arcueid Brunestud (Tsukihime)
 Ash Rivers (Vampire: The Masquerade – Bloodlines)
 Augustus Giovanni (Vampire: The Masquerade)
 Ayato Sakamaki (Diabolik Lovers)
 Azusa Mukami (Diabolik Lovers)

B
 Barabus (Vampire: The Masquerade – Bloodlines)
 Beckett (Vampire: The Masquerade – Bloodlines)
 Bertram Tung (Vampire: The Masquerade – Bloodlines)
 Bishop Vick (Vampire: The Masquerade – Bloodlines)
 Members of the Blood Angels Space Marine Chapter (Warhammer 40,000)
 Bodhi (Baldur's Gate II: Shadows of Amn)
 Brauner (Castlevania: Portrait of Ruin)
 Brother Kanker (Vampire: The Masquerade – Bloodlines)

C
 Caldaur (King's Quest II: Romancing the Stones)
 Carmilla (Castlevania series)
 Christof Romuald (Vampire: The Masquerade – Redemption)
 Closure (Arknights)
 Count Chocula (Monster Cereals by General Mills)

D
 Damsel (Vampire: The Masquerade – Bloodlines)
 Demitri Maximoff (Darkstalkers)
 Dettlaff van der Eretein (The Witcher 3: Wild Hunt)
 Dracula (Castlevania series)
 Dumah (Legacy of Kain: Soul Reaver)

E
 Ecaterina the Wise (Vampire: The Masquerade – Redemption)
 Edgar Markov (Magic: the Gathering)
 Eliza (Tekken Revolution and Tekken 7)
 Emiel Regis Rohellec Terzieff-Godefroy (The Witcher 3: Wild Hunt)
 Erika Sendo (Fortune Arterial) 

F
 Ferril (BloodRayne 2)
 Flandre Scarlet (Touhou Project)

G
 Gary Golden (Vampire: The Masquerade – Bloodlines)
 Gabriel Belmont (Castlevania: Lords of Shadow)

H
 Harkon (The Elder Scrolls V: Skyrim – Dawnguard)
 Hexxat (Baldur's Gate II: Enhanced Edition)
 Hildegard Valentine (Shadow Hearts: From the New World)

I
 Imalia (Vampire: The Masquerade – Bloodlines)
 Iori Sendo (Fortune Arterial) 
 Isaac Abrams (Vampire: The Masquerade – Bloodlines)

J
 Janos Audron (Legacy of Kain)
 Janus Hassildor (The Elder Scrolls IV: Oblivion)
 Jeanette Voerman (Vampire: The Masquerade – Bloodlines)
 Jezebel Locke (Vampire: The Masquerade – Bloodlines)
 Joachim Armster (Castlevania: Lament of Innocence)
 Joachim Valentine (Shadow Hearts: Covenant)
 Dr. Jonathan Reid (Vampyr)

K
 Kain (Legacy of Kain)
 Kanato Sakamaki (Diabolik Lovers)
 Katrina (Quest for Glory: Shadows of Darkness)
 Keith Valentine (Shadow Hearts)
 Kagan (BloodRayne and BloodRayne 2)
 Kishua Zelretch Schweinorg (Type-Moon)
 Kojou Akatsuki (Dengeki Bunko: Fighting Climax) 
 Kou Mukami (Diabolik Lovers)

L
 Laito Sakamaki (Diabolik Lovers)
 Laura (Castlevania series)
 Liam de Lioncourt (Monster Prom)
 Loretta Lecarde (Castlevania: Portrait of Ruin)
 Lowerniel Drakan (RuneScape)

M
 Maderas (Disgaea: Hour of Darkness)
 Magnus (Blood Omen 2)
 Maximillian Strauss (Vampire: The Masquerade – Bloodlines)
 Melchiah (Legacy of Kain: Soul Reaver)
 Mira Fallegeros (Killer Instinct)
 Mitnick (Vampire: The Masquerade – Bloodlines)
 Mona De Lafitte (A Vampyre Story)
 Mordoc SeLanmere (Baldur's Gate: Dark Alliance II)
 Mortis (Brawl stars)

N
 Nagoriyuki (Guilty Gear Strive)
 Neclord (Suikoden, Suikoden 2)
 Night of Wallachia (Melty Blood)
 Nines Rodriguez (Vampire: The Masquerade – Bloodlines)
 Nitara (Mortal Kombat: Deadly Alliance)

P
 Pisha (Vampire: The Masquerade – Bloodlines)

R
 Rachel Alucard (BlazBlue: Calamity Trigger)
 Rahab (Legacy of Kain: Soul Reaver)
 Ranis Drakan (RuneScape)
 Raphael Sorel (Soul series)
 Rayne (BloodRayne)
 Raziel (Legacy of Kain)
 Reiji Sakamaki (Diabolik Lovers)
 Remilia Scarlet (Touhou Project)
 Ruki Mukami (Diabolik Lovers)

S
 Satsuki Yumizuka (Tsukihime)
 Saulot (Vampire The Masquerade)
 Sebastian LaCroix (Vampire: The Masquerade – Bloodlines)
 Serana (The Elder Scrolls V: Skyrim – Dawnguard)
 Shū Sakamaki (Diabolik Lovers)
 Sion Eltnam Atlasia (Melty Blood)
 Skelter (Vampire: The Masquerade – Bloodlines)
 Slayer (Guilty Gear)
 Smiling Jack (Vampire: The Masquerade – Bloodlines)
 Sorin Markov (Magic: The Gathering)
 Stella Lecarde (Castlevania: Portrait of Ruin)
 Strahd von Zarovich (Ravenloft, Advanced Dungeons and Dragons)
 Subaru Sakamaki (Diabolik Lovers)
 Sabrina Dracula (Castlevania)

T
 Therese Voerman (Vampire: The Masquerade – Bloodlines)
 Trevor Belmont (Castlevania)
 Turel (Legacy of Kain)

U
 Umah (Blood Omen 2)

V
 Vamp (Metal Gear Solid 2: Sons of Liberty, and Metal Gear Solid 4: Guns of the Patriots)
 Valvatorez (Disgaea 4: A Promise Unforgotten)
 Vanarhost (Champions of Norrath)
 Vanescula Drakan (RuneScape)
 Vanstrom Klause (RuneScape)
 Velvet Velour (Vampire: The Masquerade – Bloodlines)
 Verzik Vitur (Old School RuneScape)
 Vincent Dorin (Castlevania: Portrait of Ruin)
 Vorador (Legacy of Kain)
 Vincent Valentine (Final Fantasy VII)

W
 Walter Bernhard (Castlevania: Lament of Innocence)
 Warfarin (Arknights)

X
 Xanhast (Baldur's Gate: Dark Alliance II)

Y
 Yuma Mukami (Diabolik Lovers)

Z
 Zephon (Legacy of Kain: Soul Reaver)

Musicals, opera and theatre 
 Alan Raby (The Phantom)
 Alfred (Tanz der Vampire)
 Armand (Lestat)
 Carmilla (Illness or Modern Women)
 Claudia (Lestat)
 Count Aubri (Der Vampyr)
 Count Dracula (Dracula, the Musical and Dracula)
 Count von Krolock (Tanz der Vampire)
 Emily (Illness or Modern Women)
 Gabrielle (Lestat)
 Feddy (Lestat)
 Herbert von Krolock (Tanz der Vampire)
 Laurant (Lestat)
 Lestat de Lioncourt (Lestat)
 Lord Ruthven (Der Vampyr, The Vampire, The Vampyre)
 Lucy Westenra (Dracula, the Musical)
 Louis de Pointe du Lac (Lestat)
 Madelaine Astarte/Madelaine Andrews (Vampire Lesbians of Sodom)
 Magda (Tanz der Vampire)
 Magnus (Lestat)
 Nicolas de Lenfent (Lestat)
 Sarah Shagal/Chagal (Tanz der Vampire)
 Yoine Shagal/Chagal (Tanz der Vampire'')

Vampiric creatures in folklore

See also
 Vampire film
 List of vampire films
 List of vampire television series
 Vampire literature
 Gothic fiction

Notes

References

vampires
 
 
-